Laka is a hero in Polynesian mythology.

Laka may also refer to:

Places

In Poland 
Łąka, a Polish word meaning "meadow", and the name of the following villages:
Łąka, Lower Silesian Voivodeship (south-west Poland)
Łąka, Nysa County in Opole Voivodeship (south-west Poland)
Łąka, Olesno County in Opole Voivodeship (south-west Poland)
Łąka, Silesian Voivodeship (south Poland)
Łąka, Subcarpathian Voivodeship (south-east Poland)
Łąka, Drawsko County in West Pomeranian Voivodeship (north-west Poland)
Łąka, Goleniów County in West Pomeranian Voivodeship (north-west Poland)

Elsewhere 
Laka, Burgas Province, a village in Pomorie Municipality, Bulgaria
, a village in Smolyan Municipality, Bulgaria
Laka, Tibet, a village in Tibet
Lake Laka in the Czech Republic
, a neighbourhood in Bornova, Turkey

Other uses 
Laka (surname)
Elvir Laković Laka, Bosnian singer-songwriter
Laka wood, a fragrant heartwood used for incense
 Lakana (boat), the traditional outrigger canoes of Madagascar
 Laka language (disambiguation), several languages

See also
 
Lakka (disambiguation)
Lakas (disambiguation)